Puise Peninsula is a peninsula in Lääne County, Estonia. Southern part of the peninsula is bordered by Matsalu Bay.

The length of the peninsula is about 8 km.

The peninsula is part of Matsalu National Park.

References

Peninsulas of Estonia
Lääne County